Byron Ernest Hyatt (September 3, 1873 – November 11, 1936) served as mayor of Boise, Idaho, from 1935 to 1936.

Hyatt died in office in November 1936. J. L. Edlefsen was appointed to finish his term as mayor.

References

External links 
Mayors of Boise - Past and Present
Idaho State Historical Society Reference Series, Corrected List of Mayors, 1867-1996

1936 deaths
Mayors of Boise, Idaho
1873 births